Panorama Sport is a newspaper published in Albania.

Sports newspapers published in Albania